Haitia is a small genus of two species in the loosestrife family of plants named for Haiti, the country where it was first collected. Both species are native to the island of Hispaniola.

References

Lythraceae
Lythraceae genera
Flora of Haiti
Flora of the Dominican Republic